Puʻukaʻoku Falls is a waterfall in Molokai, Hawaii. It is the 8th tallest waterfall in the world.

See also
List of waterfalls by height

References

Waterfalls of Hawaii (island)